The 1944 Norman Naval Air Station Zoomers football team represented the Naval Air Station Norman during the 1944 college football season. The station was located in Norman, Oklahoma. The team compiled a 6–0 record, outscored opponents by a total of 144 to 40, and was ranked No. 13 in the final AP Poll. The team won games against major college teams, Oklahoma, Arkansas, and Oklahoma A&M. Lt. Commander John Gregg was the team's coach.

Schedule

Rankings
The AP released their first rankings on October 9. The Zoomers entered the rankings on November 6.

References

Naval Air Station
Norman Naval Air Station Zoomers football
College football undefeated seasons
Norman Naval Air Station Zoomers football